Jeff Martin (born ) is an American television producer and writer. He originally wrote for The Simpsons during the second, third, fourth and fifth seasons, and eventually returned over 20 years later to write again for seasons 27 and 28. He attended Harvard University, where he wrote for The Harvard Lampoon. He left along with most of the original staff in 1993 and has since written for several TV shows including Listen Up!, Baby Blues, and Homeboys in Outer Space. He wrote for Late Night with David Letterman during the 1980s and occasionally appeared on the show as Flunky the late-night viewer mail clown, a depressed clown who smoked cigarettes and sometimes talked about his infected tattoos and other health problems. Martin won four Emmys during his time at Late Night.

He lives in Los Angeles with his wife, fellow television producer and writer Suzanne Martin.

Writing credits

The Simpsons episodes 
He is credited with writing the following episodes:

"Dead Putting Society" (1990)
"Oh Brother, Where Art Thou?" (1991)
"Three Men and a Comic Book" (1991)
"Treehouse of Horror II" (co-writer) (1991)
"I Married Marge" (1991)
"The Otto Show" (1992)
"A Streetcar Named Marge" (1992)
"Lisa the Beauty Queen" (1992)
"Lisa's First Word" (1992)
"Homer's Barbershop Quartet" (1993)
"How Lisa Got Her Marge Back" (2016)
"Moho House" (2017)
"I'm Just a Girl Who Can't Say D'oh" (co-writer) (2019)
"Yokel Hero" (co-writer) (2021)

Listen Up! episodes 
"Pilot"

References

External links
 

American television producers
American television writers
American male television writers
American members of the Churches of Christ
Emmy Award winners
Living people
The Kinkaid School alumni
The Harvard Lampoon alumni
Place of birth missing (living people)
Year of birth missing (living people)